Mount Hemphill is a snow-covered mountain that rises above  in the southern part of the Anare Mountains of Victoria Land, Antarctica. It stands between the head of McLean Glacier and Ebbe Glacier. The mountain was mapped by the United States Geological Survey from surveys and U.S. Navy air photos, 1960–63, and was named by the Advisory Committee on Antarctic Names for Lieutenant Harold S. Hemphill, U.S. Navy, a photographic officer with Squadron VX-6 in Antarctica, 1962–63 and 1963–64. This topographical feature lies situated on the Pennell Coast, a portion of Antarctica lying between Cape Williams and Cape Adare.

References

Mountains of Victoria Land
Pennell Coast